The Kuzari, full title Book of Refutation and Proof on Behalf of the Despised Religion (: Kitâb al-ḥujja wa'l-dalîl fi naṣr al-dîn al-dhalîl), also known as the Book of the Khazar (: Sefer ha-Kuzari), is one of the most famous works of the medieval Spanish Jewish philosopher and poet Judah Halevi, completed in the Hebrew year 4900 (1139-40CE).

Originally written in Arabic, prompted by Halevi's contact with a Spanish Karaite, it was then translated by numerous scholars, including Judah ben Saul ibn Tibbon, into Hebrew and other languages, and is regarded as one of the most important apologetic works of Jewish philosophy. Divided into five parts (ma'amarim – articles), it takes the form of a dialogue between a rabbi and the king of the Khazars, who has invited the former to instruct him in the tenets of Judaism in comparison with those of the other two Abrahamic religions: Christianity and Islam.

Historical foundation 

The Kuzari takes place during a conversion of some Khazar nobility to Judaism. The historicity of this event is debated. The Khazar Correspondence, along with other historical documents, are said to indicate a conversion of the Khazar nobility to Judaism. A minority of scholars, among them Moshe Gil and Shaul Stampfer have challenged the documents claim to represent a real historical event. The scale of conversions within the Khazar Khaganate is unknown.

Influence of the Kuzari 
The Kuzari's emphasis on the uniqueness of the Jewish people. The Torah and the land of Israel bears witness to a radical change of direction in Jewish thinking at that juncture in history, which coincided with the Crusades. Setting aside the possible exception of the work of Maimonides, it had a profound impact on the subsequent development of Judaism, and has remained central to Jewish religious tradition.

Given what has been generally regarded as its pronounced anti-philosophical tendencies, a direct line has been drawn, prominently by Gershom Scholem, between it and the rise of the anti-rationalist Kabbalah movement.

The ideas and style of the work played an important role in debates within the Haskalah or Jewish Enlightenment movement.

Translations 
Besides the 12th-century Hebrew translation of Judah ben Saul ibn Tibbon, which passed through eleven printed editions (1st ed. Fano, 1506), another rendering into Hebrew was made by Judah ben Isaac Cardinal, at the beginning of the 13th century, but it was less successful, and only portions survive.

In 1887 the Arabic original was published for the first time by Hartwig Hirschfeld, and in 1977 a modern critical text was published by David H. Baneth. Parallel to his Arabic edition, Hirschfeld also published a critical edition of the Ibn Tibbon translation of the text, based upon six medieval manuscripts. In 1885, Hirschfeld published the first German translation from the Arabic original, and in 1905 his English translation from Arabic appeared. In 1972, the first modern translation by Yehudah Even-Shemuel into Modern Hebrew from the Arabic original was published. In 1994, a French translation by Charles Touati from the Arabic original was published. In 1997, a Hebrew translation by Rabbi Yosef Qafih from the Arabic original was published, which is now in its fourth edition (published in 2013). A 2009 English translation by Rabbi N. Daniel Korobkin is in print by Feldheim Publishers.

Contents

First essay

Introduction 
After a short account of the incidents preceding the conversion of the king, and of his conversations with a philosopher, a Christian, and a Muslim concerning their respective beliefs, a Jew appears on the stage, and by his first statement startles the king; for, instead of giving him proofs of the existence of God, he asserts and explains the miracles performed by Him in favor of the Israelites.

The king expresses his astonishment at this exordium, which seems to him incoherent; but the Jew replies that the existence of God, the creation of the world, etc., being taught by religion, do not need any speculative demonstrations. Further, he propounds the principle upon which his religious system is founded; namely, that revealed religion is far superior to natural religion. For the aim of ethical training, which is the object of religion, is not to create in man good intentions, but to cause him to perform good deeds. This aim can not be attained by philosophy, which is undecided as to the nature of good, but can be secured by religious training, which teaches what is good. As science is the sum of all truth found by successive generations, so religious training is based upon a set of traditions; in other words, history is an important factor in the development of human culture and science.

"Creatio ex Nihilo" 

Halevi writes that as the Jews are the only depositaries of a written history of the development of the human race from the beginning of the world, the superiority of their traditions can not be denied. Halevi asserts that no comparison is possible between Jewish culture, which in his view is based upon religious truth, and Greek culture, which is based upon science only. He holds that the wisdom of Greek philosophers lacked that divine support with which the Israelite prophets were endowed. Had a trustworthy tradition that the world was created out of nothing been known to Aristotle, he would have supported it by at least as strong arguments as those advanced by him to prove the eternity of matter. Belief in the eternity of matter, however, is not absolutely contrary to Jewish religious ideas; for the Biblical narrative of the Creation refers only to the beginning of the human race, and does not preclude the possibility of preexistent matter.

Still, relying upon tradition, the Jews believe in "creatio ex nihilo" which theory can be sustained by as powerful arguments as those advanced in favor of the belief in the eternity of matter. The objection that the Absolutely Infinite and Perfect could not have produced imperfect and finite beings, made by the Neoplatonists to the theory of "creatio ex nihilo," is not removed by attributing the existence of all mundane things to the action of nature; for the latter is only a link in the chain of causes having its origin in the First Cause, which is God.

Superiority of his faith 

Halevi now attempts to demonstrate the superiority of his religion, Judaism. The preservation of the Israelites in Egypt and in the wilderness, the delivery to them of the Torah (law) on Mount Sinai, and their later history are to him evident proofs of its superiority. He impresses upon the king the fact that the favor of God can be won only by following God's precepts in their totality, and that those precepts are binding only on Jews. The question of why the Jews were favored with God's instruction is answered in the Kuzari at I:95: it was based upon their pedigree, i.e., Noah's most pious son was Shem. His most pious son was Arpachshad etc. Abraham was Arpachshad's descendant, Isaac was Abraham's most pious son, and Jacob was Isaac's most pious son. The sons of Jacob were all worthy and their children became the Jews. The Jew then shows that the immortality of the soul, resurrection, reward, and punishment are all implied in Scripture and are referred to in Jewish writings.

Second essay

Question of attributes 

In the second essay Judah enters into a detailed discussion of some of the theological questions hinted at in the preceding one. To these belongs in the first place that of the divine attributes. Judah rejects entirely the doctrine of essential attributes which had been propounded by Saadia Gaon and Bahya ibn Paquda. For him there is no difference between essential and other attributes. Either the attribute affirms a quality in God, in which case essential attributes can not be applied to Him more than can any other, because it is impossible to predicate anything of Him, or the attribute expresses only the negation of the contrary quality, and in that case there is no harm in using any kind of attributes. Accordingly, Judah divides all the attributes found in the Bible into three classes: active, relative, and negative, which last class comprises all the essential attributes expressing mere negations.

The question of attributes being closely connected with that of anthropomorphism, Judah enters into a lengthy discussion on this point. Although opposed to the conception of the corporeality of God, as being contrary to Scripture, he would consider it wrong to reject all the sensuous concepts of anthropomorphism, as there is something in these ideas which fills the human soul with the awe of God.

The remainder of the essay comprises dissertations on the following subjects: the excellence of Israel, the land of prophecy, which is to other countries what the Jews are to other nations; the sacrifices; the arrangement of the Tabernacle, which, according to Judah, symbolizes the human body; the prominent spiritual position occupied by Israel, whose relation to other nations is that of the heart to the limbs; the opposition evinced by Judaism toward asceticism, in virtue of the principle that the favor of God is to be won only by carrying out His precepts, and that these precepts do not command man to subdue the inclinations suggested by the faculties of the soul, but to use them in their due place and proportion; the excellence of the Hebrew language, which, although sharing now the fate of the Jews, is to other languages what the Jews are to other nations and what Israel is to other lands.

Third essay - the oral tradition
The third essay is devoted to the refutation of the teachings of Karaism and to the history of the development of the oral tradition, the Talmud. Judah ha-Levi shows that there is no means of carrying out the precepts without having recourse to oral tradition; that such tradition has always existed may be inferred from many passages of the Bible, the very reading of which is dependent upon it, since there were no vowels or accents in the original text.

Fourth essay - Names of God 

The fourth essay opens with an analysis of the various names of God found in the Bible. According to Judah, all these names, with the exception of the Tetragrammaton, are attributes expressing the various states of God's activity in the world. The multiplicity of names no more implies a multiplicity in His essence than do the multifarious influences of the rays of the sun on various bodies imply a multiplicity of suns. To the intuitive vision of the prophet the actions proceeding from God appear under the images of the corresponding human actions. Angels are God's messengers, and either they exist for a length of time, or they are created only for special purposes.

From the names of God and the essence of angels Judah passes to his favorite theme and shows that the views of the Prophets are a purer source for a knowledge of God than the teachings of the philosophers. Although he professes great reverence for the "Sefer Yetẓirah," from which he quotes many passages, he hastens to add that the theories of Abraham elucidated therein had been held by the patriarch before God revealed Himself to him. The essay concludes with examples of the astronomical and medical knowledge of the ancient Hebrews.

Fifth essay - Arguments against philosophy 

The fifth and last essay is devoted to a criticism of the various philosophical systems known at the time of the author. Judah attacks by turns the Aristotelian cosmology, psychology, and metaphysics. To the doctrine of emanation, based, according to him, upon the Aristotelian cosmological principle that no simple being can produce a compound being, he objects in the form of the following query: "Why did the emanation stop at the lunar sphere? Why should each intelligence think only of itself and of that from which it issued and thus give birth to one emanation, thinking not at all of the preceding intelligences, and thereby losing the power to give birth to many emanations?"

He argues against the theory of Aristotle that the soul of man is his thought and that only the soul of the philosopher will be united, after the death of the body, with the active intellect. "Is there," he asks, "any curriculum of the knowledge one has to acquire to win immortality? How is it that the soul of one man differs from that of another? How can one forget a thing once thought of?" and many other questions of the kind. He shows himself especially severe against the Motekallamin, whose arguments on the creation of the world, on God and His unity, he terms dialectic exercises and mere phrases.

However, Judah ha-Levi is against limiting philosophical speculation to matters concerning creation and God; he follows the Greek philosophers in examining the creation of the material world. Thus he admits that every being is made up of matter and form. The movement of the spheres formed the sphere of the elements, from the fusion of which all beings were created. This fusion, which varied according to climate, gave to matter the potentiality to receive from God a variety of forms, from the mineral, which is the lowest in the scale of creation, to man, who is the highest because of his possessing, in addition to the qualities of the mineral, vegetable, and animal, a hylic intellect which is influenced by the active intellect. This hylic intellect, which forms the rational soul, is a spiritual substance and not an accident, and is therefore imperishable.

The discussion concerning the soul and its faculties leads naturally to the question of free will. Judah upholds the doctrine of free will against the Epicureans and the Fatalists, and endeavors to reconcile it with the belief in God's providence and omniscience.

Commentaries on the book 

As mentioned above, six commentaries were printed in the fifteenth century, four of them known to us:

 Edut LeYisrael- (literally, "witness for Israel"), by Rabbi Shlomo Ben Menachem. (This print is lost).
 Kol Yehuda- (literally, "the voice of Judah"), by Rabbi Yehuda Muskato.

And two commentaries of two students of Rabbi Shlomo Ben Menachem: Rabbi Yaakov Ben Parisol and Rabbi Netanel Ben Nechemya Hacaspi. (For more information, see the translation of Yehudah Even-Shemuel, preface, p. 53).

In the 20th century, several more commentaries were written, including:

 "The Kuzari - Commentary", by Rabbi Shlomo Aviner, four volumes.
 "The Explained Kuzari", by Rabbi David Cohen, three volumes.

All the above commentaries are in Hebrew.

Bibliography 
Yehuda ha-Levi. Kuzari. Translated by N. Daniel Korobkin as The Kuzari: In Defense of the Despised Faith. Northvale, N.J.: Jason Aronson, 1998. 2nd Edition (revised) published Jerusalem:Feldheim Publishers, 2009.
Yechezkel Sarna. Rearrangement of the Kuzari., Transl. Rabbi Avraham Davis. New York: Metsudah, 1986
 Adam Shear. The Kuzari and the shaping of Jewish identity, 1167–1900. Cambridge ;New York :Cambridge University Press,2008 
D. M. Dunlop.  History of the Jewish Khazars. Princeton: Princeton Univ. Press, 1954.

References

External links 
Resources on the Kuzari itself
Complete English translation by Hartwig Hirschfeld (1905) at Wikisource.
Complete Hebrew translation based on that of Rabbi Judah ibn Tibbon.
Hebrew Fulltext
Arabic original in Judeo-Arabic.
Kuzari Video Lessons (Hebrew) Link not working.

Jewish philosophical and ethical texts
Khazars
Jewish medieval literature
Jewish apologetics
12th-century Arabic books
Sifrei Kodesh